La Burrerita de Ypacaraí is a 1962 Argentine film. The film contains music and an appearance from Paraguayan singer Luis Alberto del Paraná.
Also was the first argentinian film to be dubbed in french.

Plot
Beautiful farmer's daughter Isabel can have any man in the village, but she falls in love with the wrong man and his sins cost both of them their lives at the Iguazú Falls.

Cast
Isabel Sarli  as Isabel
Ernesto Báez as Vergara
Armando Bó as Quiroga
Luis Alberto del Parana as Luis

External links
 

1962 films
1960s Spanish-language films
Guaraní-language films
Films set in Paraguay
Argentine black-and-white films
Films directed by Armando Bó
1960s Argentine films